On 29 September 2020, a 22-year-old Dalit college girl was gang-raped and assaulted in Balrampur, Uttar Pradesh and she died on way to the hospital. As per her family, she was abducted on her way back home and raped by at least two men, Shahid and Sahil. Postmortem report suggests she was badly tortured even after rape. The postmortem report said there were at least ten antemortem injuries on her body eight contusion wounds on her cheek, chest, elbows, left thigh and two abrasions on her left leg and knee. The two main accused have been arrested by the UP police, and the Uttar Pradesh government has offered financial assistance to the victim's family.

Incident and arrests
The incident took place on the evening of Tuesday, 29 September, when the victim, a second year B Com student, was returning home. Her mother told reporters that the woman went to get her admission at 10 am, and on her way back, few men forcibly put her in their car, injected her with sedatives and raped her. They broke her legs and sent her back in a rickshaw.

The girl returned home in a serious condition, prompting her parents to rush her to a nearby hospital, but she died on the way, and the matter was reported to the police from the hospital. According to the Balrampur Superintendent of Police Dev Ranjan Verma, "the police acted upon the parent's complaint, and identified the accused as Shahid and Sahil and arrested them".

Cremation

The woman was cremated on the night of Wednesday, 30 September in the presence of her family members and UP Police.

See also 
2020 Hathras gang rape and murder

References 

2020 crimes in India
Gang rape in India
Incidents of violence against women
Balrampur
Crime in Uttar Pradesh